The 2014–15 Algerian Cup was the 51st edition of the Algerian Cup. The winners were MO Béjaïa who qualified to the 2016 CAF Confederation Cup.

Round of 64
The round of 64 was held on 12 and 13 December 2014.

Round of 32

Round of 16

Quarter-finals

Semi-finals

Final

References

Algerian Cup
Algerian Cup
Algerian Cup